Mesplet may refer to:

Fleury Mesplet (1734–1794), a French-born Canadian printer best known for founding the Montreal Gazette
Mesplet Lake, Quebec, Canada